Farmton is an unincorporated community in Volusia County, Florida, United States off Osteen-Maytown Road, eight miles west of Interstate 95. Farmton is located near the St. Johns River, west of Cow Creek and east of Osteen.

References

Unincorporated communities in Volusia County, Florida
Unincorporated communities in Florida